The 3rd Golden Bell Awards was held on 26 March 1967 at the Zhongshan Hall in Taipei, Taiwan.

Winners

References

1967
1967 in Taiwan